Jubair Muhammed is an Indian music composer and playback singer who works in Malayalam cinema. Jubair has worked on Malayalam, Tamil, Kannada, Telugu and Hindi language films, Music Videos and Short Films.

Early life

Jubair Muhammed was born to Abdul Shukkoor and Haseena Beevi in the town of Attingal, located within the Thiruvananthapuram district of Kerala, India. He did his schooling at the Government Higher Secondary School, Navaikulam, Kallambalam, and completed his bachelor's degree in Arabic literature from the University College Thiruvananthapuram. After the completion of his bachelor's degree, he started an interior design firm in his hometown.

Career
Jubair entered the music industry by working on Short Films and television advertisements in Malayalam. His first film as a music director was an unreleased film in Tamil. His next work, which marked his entry to Malayalam cinema, was for the Malayalam film Chunkzz, directed by Omar Lulu. His guest appearance in Oru Adaar Love as a musician increased his popularity.

Discography

Acting Credits

Films

Albums

Short films

Honours and awards
Jubair Muhammed made an entry into the Guinness World Records for the movie Netaji as a Music Director.

Guinness World Records
 Guinness Book of Records – Music Director for the movie Netaji

Others
Official Theme song of Kerala University Festivals 2018

References

External links 

1994 births
Living people
Guinness World Records
Malayalam playback singers
Music directors
University College Thiruvananthapuram alumni